Tracker is a Soviet feature film, a drama directed by Roman Balayan. The film was shot in 1987 in Kaluga.

Plot
It's 1916, World War I, the premonition of the revolution. Vorobyov, a gymnasium teacher, retires from service in protest at the dismissal of revolutionary-minded teachers, although he does not share their views. He remains without means of subsistence – there is nothing to pay for a rented apartment, he has a sick child who needs to be treated in the Crimea. Vorobyov is looking for work, even the worst, just to pay money.
The gendarmerie offers him to become a filer (spy, secret observer), cooperate with them and report all the unreliable people. Vorobyov faces a monstrous choice – or become a snitch, or remain an honest man without a livelihood. The impossibility of going out makes him commit suicide.

Cast
 Oleg Yankovsky as Pyotr Vorobyov 
 Yelena Safonova as Nastya, Vorobyov's wife
  Aleksandr Vokach as Head of the Gendarme Department
 Oleksiy Gorbunov as Lavrentiev, gendarme lieutenant
 Aleksandr Zbruyev as Yakov Pyatkin
Olga Ostroumova as Nina
 Filipp Yankovsky as episode
 Aleksandr Abdulov as Vanya
 Bohdan Beniuk as Janitor
 Igor Gnevashev as episode

Awards
1988 –  Prize to Oleg Yankovsky for the best performance of the male role at the Seminci (Spain)

References

External links
 
1987 drama films
Soviet drama films
Russian drama films
1987 films
Films directed by Roman Balayan